The Junior Eurovision Song Contest (often shortened to JESC, Junior Eurovision or Junior EuroSong) is an international song competition which has been organised by the European Broadcasting Union (EBU) annually since 2003. It is held in a different European city each year, however the same city can host the contest more than once.

The competition has many similarities to the Eurovision Song Contest from which its name is taken. Each participating broadcaster sends an act, the members of which are aged 9 to 14 on the day of the contest, and an original song lasting three minutes at most to compete against the other participating entries. Each entry represents the country served by the participating broadcaster. Viewers from all around the world are invited to vote for their favourite performances by online voting, and a national jury from each participating country also vote. The overall winner of the contest is the entry that receives the most points after the scores from every country have been collected and totalled.

In addition to the countries taking part, the 2003 contest was also broadcast in Estonia, Finland and Germany (who would not debut until the 2020 contest), followed by Andorra in 2006, Bosnia and Herzegovina (from 2006 to 2011) and Iceland in 2021, however these countries have yet to participate. Since 2006, the contest has been streamed live on the Internet through the official website of the contest. Australia was invited to participate in the  contest, while Kazakhstan was invited in the  contest, making it the only major Eurovision event to feature multiple associate member broadcasters.

Origins and history 

The origins of the contest date back to 2000 when Danmarks Radio held a song contest for Danish children that year and the following year. The idea was extended to a Scandinavian song festival in 2002, MGP Nordic, with Denmark, Norway and Sweden as participants. TVP went on to hold further editions in Konin between 2003 and 2006, some time of which after Poland's initial withdrawal from Junior Eurovision Song Contest.

In November 2002, the EBU picked up the idea for a song contest featuring children and opened the competition to all member broadcasters making it a pan-European event. The working title of the programme was "Eurovision Song Contest for Children", branded with the name of the EBU's long-running and already popular song competition, the Eurovision Song Contest. Denmark was asked to host the first edition after experience with MGP Nordic in that country.

After a successful first contest in Copenhagen, the second faced several location problems. The event originally should have been organised by British broadcaster ITV in Manchester. ITV then announced that due to financial and scheduling reasons, the contest would not take place in the United Kingdom. It is also thought that another factor to their decision was the previous year's audience ratings for ITV which were below the expected amount. The EBU approached Croatian broadcaster HRT, who had won the previous contest, to stage the event in Zagreb, though it later emerged that HRT had 'forgotten' to book the venue in which the contest would have taken place. It was at this point, with five months remaining until the event would be held, that Norwegian broadcaster NRK stepped in to host the contest in Lillehammer.

Broadcasters have had to bid for the rights to host the contest since 2004 to avoid such problems from happening again. Belgium was therefore the first country to successfully bid for the rights to host the contest in 2005.

All contests have been broadcast in 16:9 widescreen and in high definition. All have also had a CD produced with the songs from the show. Between 2003 and 2006, DVDs of the contest were also produced though this ended due to lack of interest.

As of 2008, the winner of the contest is decided by 50% televote and 50% national jury vote. The winners of all previous contests had been decided exclusively by televoting. Between 2003 and 2005 viewers had around 10 minutes to vote after all the songs had been performed. Between 2006 and 2010 the televoting lines were open throughout the programme. Since 2011 viewers vote after all the songs had been performed. Profits made from the televoting during the 2007 and 2008 contests were donated to UNICEF.

Prior to 2007, a participating broadcaster's failure in not broadcasting the contest live would incur a fine. Now broadcasters are no longer required to broadcast the contest live, but may transmit it with some delay at a time that is more appropriate for children's television broadcast.

The 2007 contest was the subject of the 2008 documentary Sounds Like Teen Spirit: A Popumentary. The film followed several contestants as they made their way through the national finals and onto the show itself. It was shown at the Toronto International Film Festival 2008 and was premiered in Ghent, Belgium and Limassol, Cyprus where the 2008 contest was held.

Format
The format of the contest has remained relatively unchanged over the course of its history in that the format consists of successive live musical performances by the artists entered by the participating broadcasters. The EBU claims that the aim of the programme is "to promote young talent in the field of popular music, by encouraging competition among the [...] performers".

The programme was always screened on a Saturday night in late November/early December and lasts approximately two hours fifteen minutes. Since 2016, the contest is screened on an early Sunday evening.

Traditionally the contest will consist of an opening ceremony in which the performers are welcomed to the event, the performances of the entries, a recap of the songs to help televoting viewers decide which entries to vote for, an interval act usually performed after the televoting has closed, the results of the televoting or back-up jury voting which is then followed by the declaration of the winner and a reprise of the winning song. At various points throughout the show, networks may opt out for a few minutes to screen a commercial break.

Since 2008 the winning entry of each contest has been decided by a mixture of televoting and national juries, each counting for fifty per cent of the points awarded by each country. The winners of all previous contests had been decided exclusively by televoting. The ten entries that have received the most votes in each country are awarded points ranging from one to eight, then ten and twelve. These points are then announced live during the programme by a spokesperson representing the participating country (who, like the participants, is aged between ten and fifteen). Once all participating countries have announced their results, the country that has received the most points is declared the winner of that year's contest.

Until 2013 the winners receive a trophy and a certificate. Since 2013 contest the winner, runner-up and third place all win trophies and certificates.

Originally, unlike its adult version, the winning country did not receive the rights to host the next contest. From 2014 until 2017, the winning country had first refusal on hosting the following contest. Italy used this clause in 2015 to decline hosting the contest that year after their victory in 2014. On 15 October 2017, the EBU announced a return to the original system in 2018, claiming that it would help provide broadcasters with a greater amount of time to prepare, ensuring the continuation of the contest into the future. However, from 2019 onwards all contests have been hosted by the previous year's winning country.

The contest usually features two presenters, one man and one woman, who regularly appear on stage and with the contestants in the green room. The presenters are also responsible for repeating the results immediately after the spokesperson of each broadcaster to confirm which country the points are being given to. Between 2003 and 2012, the spokespersons gave out the points in the same format as the adult contest, behind a backdrop of a major city of that country in the national broadcaster's television studio. From 2013 onwards, the spokespersons give the points from their country on the arena stage, as opposed to the adult contest where spokespersons are broadcast live from their respective country (with the exception of 2020, due to travel restrictions related to the COVID-19 pandemic).

Despite the Junior Eurovision Song Contest being modelled on the format of the Eurovision Song Contest, there are many distinctive differences that are unique to the children's contest. For instance, each country's entry must be selected through a televised national final (unless circumstances prevent this and permission is gained from the EBU). Each country's performance is also allowed a maximum of eight performers on stage, as opposed to the original number of six in the Eurovision Song Contest. From 2005 to 2015 every contestant was automatically awarded 12 points to prevent the contestants scoring zero points, although ending with 12 points total was in essence the same as receiving zero, however, no entry has ever received nul points in total scoring.

Entry restrictions 

The song must be written and sung in the national language (or one of the national languages) of the country being represented. However, they can also have a few lines in a different language. The same rule was in the adults' contest from 1966 to 1972 and again from 1977 to 1998. This rule was later changed so that up to 25% of a song could be in a different language, usually English. This rule was changed again in 2017, now allowing up to 40% to be in English.

Originally the competition was open to children between the ages of 8 and 15, however in 2007 the age range was narrowed so that only children aged 10 to 15 on the day of the contest were allowed to enter. In 2016 the age range was changed again. From now on children aged 9 to 14 on the day of the contest are allowed to enter.

The song submitted into the contest cannot have previously been released commercially and must last 3 minutes at most. The rule stating that performers also must not have previously released music commercially was active from 2003 to 2006. This rule was dropped in 2007 thus allowing already experienced singers and bands in the competition. As a result, NRK chose to withdraw from the contest.

Since 2008, adults have been allowed to assist in the writing of entries. Previously, all writers had to be aged 10 to 15.

Organisation

The contest is produced each year by the European Broadcasting Union (EBU). The original executive supervisor of the contest was Svante Stockselius who also headed the Steering Group that decides on the rules of the contest, which broadcaster hosts the next contest and oversees the entire production of each programme. In 2011, he was succeeded by Sietse Bakker. In 2013, Vladislav Yakovlev took over the position. Yakovlev was dismissed without any clear reason after three contests, and was replaced by Jon Ola Sand, who had been Executive Supervisor for the Eurovision Song Contest since . On 30 September 2019, Sand announced his intention to step down as Executive Supervisor and Head of Live Events after the Eurovision Song Contest 2020, which was later cancelled due to the COVID-19 pandemic. Martin Österdahl was named his successor, starting with the 2020 contest.

Steering Group meetings tend to include the Heads of Delegation whose principal job is to liaise between the EBU and the broadcaster they represent. It is also their duty to make sure that the performers are never left alone without an adult and to "create a team atmosphere amongst the [performers] and to develop their experience and a sense of community."

The table below lists all Executive Supervisors of the Junior Eurovision Song Contest since the first edition (2003):

Junior Eurovision logo and theme 

The former generic logo was introduced for the 2008 contest in Limassol, to create a consistent visual identity. Each year of the contest, the host country creates a sub-theme which is usually accompanied and expressed with a sub-logo and slogan. The theme and slogan are announced by the EBU and the host country's national broadcaster.

The generic logo was revamped in March 2015, seven years after the first generic logo was created. The logo was used for the first time in the 2015 contest in Sofia.

Slogans 
Each contest since 2005 has had a slogan, chosen by the host broadcaster. Based on the slogan, the theme and the visual design are developed.

Participation 

All active member broadcasters of the EBU are permitted to take part in the contest, though the contest has been broadcast in several non-participating countries.

Participation in the contest tends to change dramatically each year. The original Scandinavian broadcasters left the contest in 2006 because they found the treatment of the contestants unethical, and revived the MGP Nordic competition, which had not been produced since the Junior Eurovision Song Contest began. The  is the only country to have taken part every year since the first contest in 2003.

40 countries have competed at least once. Listed are all the countries that have ever taken part in the competition alongside the year in which they made their debut:

Winning entries 

Both Croatia and Italy achieved their wins on their debut participation in the contest.

Interval acts and guest appearances 

The tradition of interval acts between the songs in the competition programme and the announcement of the voting has been established since the inaugural contest in 2003.

The winners of Junior Eurovision from 2003 to 2009 performed a medley of their entries together on stage during the 2010 interval. As part of the 2022 interval, eleven previous winners performed in a medley of all the winning songs to date, for the occasion of the 20th edition of the event. The other eight winning songs were performed by the Tavush Diocese Children’s Choir.

The previous winner has performed on a number of occasions since 2005, and from 2013 all participants have performed a "common song" together on stage during the interval. Similar performances took place in 2007 and 2010 with the specially-commissioned UNICEF songs "One World" and "A Day Without War" respectively, the latter with Dmitry Koldun. The official charity song for the  contest was "We Can Be Heroes", the money from the sales of which went to the Dutch children's charity KidsRights Foundation.

The  event in Limassol, Cyprus finished with the presenters inviting everyone on stage to sing "Hand in Hand", which was written especially for UNICEF and the Junior Eurovision Song Contest that year.

Ruslana was invited to perform at the 2013 contest, which took place in her country's capital Kyiv. Nevertheless, on the day of the contest she withdrew her act from the show, due to the violence shown by the Ukrainian authorities against the Euromaidan protesters.

Since  (with the exceptions of 2012, 2014 and 2017), the opening of the show has included a "Parade of Nations" or the "Flag Parade", similar to the Olympic Games opening ceremony. The parade was adopted by the Eurovision Song Contest in 2013 and has continued every year since.

Eurovision Song Contest 
Below is a list of former participants of the Junior Eurovision Song Contest who have gone on to participate at the senior version of the contest. Since , the winner of the Junior Eurovision Song Contest has been invited as a guest at the adult contest the following year.

1.As a member of KWADro.
2.As a member of The Peppermints
3.As Lisa, Amy and Shelley
4.As a backing vocalist for Lina Joy
5.As a member of Kisses
6.As a member of Candy

See also 

 Bala Turkvision Song Contest
 Turkvision Song Contest
 Eurovision Song Contest
 Eurovision Choir
 Eurovision Dance Contest
 Eurovision Magic Circus Show
 Eurovision Young Dancers
 Eurovision Young Musicians
 MGP Nordic

References

External links 

 
 Junior Eurovision Song Contest – European Broadcasting Union

 
Eurovision events
Youth music competitions
Song contests
Recurring events established in 2003
2003 establishments in Europe